Dragiša Pejović (Serbian Cyrillic: Дpaгишa Пejoвић; born 31 July 1982, in Kragujevac) is a Serbian footballer. He became well-known after revealing of match fixing in Serbian football as a special guest at FIFpro. He blames representatives of Borac Cacak for match fixing and physical violence.

External sources
 Profile and stats at Srbijafudbal.

1982 births
Living people
Sportspeople from Kragujevac
Serbian footballers
FK Novi Pazar players
FK Borac Čačak players
Serbian SuperLiga players
Association football defenders